Siege of Bristol or Storming of Bristol may refer to:

 Siege of Bristol (1326)
 Storming of Bristol (1643)
 Siege of Bristol (1645)